Jie Mi may refer to:

Decoded (novel), a 2002 Chinese novel by Mai Jia
Decoded (Chinese TV series), a 2016 Chinese TV series based on Mai Jia's novel
Disclosed, a 2013 Singaporean TV series